Neshaminy High School is a public high school in Middletown Township (Langhorne post office address) in Bucks County, Pennsylvania, United States. It is the only high school in the Neshaminy School District, serving students in Middletown Township, Lower Southampton Township, Hulmeville, Langhorne, Langhorne Manor, and Penndel. In 2022, the school enrolled 2,677 students in grades 9 through 12. "U.S. News & World Report" ranked the school 117 out of 718 Pennsylvania high schools in 2022.

History
Before the 1950s, most of lower Bucks County, Pennsylvania was rural farmland. In 1922, Langhorne Borough and Middletown Township signed an agreement to create Langhorne-Middletown High School at the corner of Cherry Street and Maple Avenue. By 1946, Langhorne Manor, Penndel, Hulmeville, and Lower Southampton agreed to participate in the expansion of Langhorne-Middletown High School. However, their plan changed when William J. Levitt announced his plan to establish Levittown, one of America's first planned communities, partially located in Middletown Township. Because of Levittown and other new housing developments, the district needed a new high school. Neshaminy High School opened in 1953, covering grades 7 through 12.

In the early 1970s the population went up to 3,500. As the district continued its rapid expansion in the 1960s, Neshaminy High School underwent multiple expansions. However, the community eventually decided that it needed a second high school. In 1975, Neshaminy-Maple Point High School opened in the district's northern end; the existing Neshaminy High School became Neshaminy-Langhorne High School. Shortly after its opening, the community saw a rapid population decline, leading to the closure of Neshaminy-Maple Point only eight years after it opened. Once again, the entire district attended a single Neshaminy Senior High School for grades 10 through 12. The name of Neshaminy High had reverted from Neshaminy-Langhorne High School. The former Neshaminy-Maple Point High School reopened in 1993 as Maple Point Middle School and included grade 9.

In 2003, the Neshaminy School Board proposed demolishing the current school building and constructing a new facility on the same school grounds. This plan was priced at $100 million and required an $85 million tax-funded bond. In April 2004, residents voted against the new building referendum due to its cost.

As an alternative plan, the school board decided to demolish sections of the school and rebuild them as the school year proceeded. This major renovation project was estimated to cost $72 million and would replace 95% of classroom facilities. The existing auditorium, gym, cafeteria, and library were not replaced because they had significant renovations as recently as 1995. When construction finished in September 2009, the school welcomed ninth graders back for the first time in three decades.

Campus
Neshaminy High School consists of a main building with a central hallway and branching hallways organized by department. There are two gymnasiums, one at the front of the school and one at the back. The school also has two theaters. The larger Theodore Kloos Auditorium is in the front of the main building and is used by the school's music department for the annual musical, and outside groups for performances. The school's drama department uses the smaller, black box theater.

As of 1982 its capacity was 2,500.

Academics 
In the 2020–2021 school year, 25% of students were proficient in the English keystones, 76.7% were professional in the algebra keystones, and 85.3% were proficient in the biology keystones. These scores may be lower than in previous years due to the impacts of the COVID-19 Pandemic. The school's average graduation rate was 93%.

In 2015–2016, Neshaminy students took Advanced Placement (A.P.) exams in eighteen areas. In 2020, Neshaminy students' average SAT score was 1190 (600 math, 590 verbal). The average ACT score was 27.

Extracurricular activities
Neshaminy High School offers dozens of co-curricular activities, including Action Adventure Club, Anime Club, Art Studio, Book Club, Ceramics Club, Change It Up Club, color guard, concert choir, dance team, debate team, Diversity Pride Club, dramatics, Environmental Action Club, Friends Helping Friends, Future Business Leaders of America, Future Problem Solvers, Interact, jazz band and ensemble, marching band, MiniTHON, Nature Club, National Honor Society, photography, Reading Olympics, select choir, Spectrum, and World Language Club.

Gym Night
Neshaminy High School held its first Gym Night in the 1953–1954 school year. Since then, Gym Night has grown into a community-wide annual event. For the event, the student body divides into the Blue (last names A-K) and Red (last names L-Z) teams. For two nights in late winter, the two teams compete in relays and dance exhibitions designed and choreographed by the student. One team is crowned champion based on choreography, decorations, performance in relays, and sportsmanship.

Student publications
The school's student newspaper is "The Playwickian." It has received awards from Columbia University for outstanding performance. On April 2, 2014, students Jackson Haines and Emily Scott received awards from the 2014 Scholastic Keystone Press Awards contest from articles published in "The Playwickian" about the school's mascot. Haines also receive a Gold Circle Award from the Columbia Scholastic Press Association for the same article. In July, the Pennsylvania High School Press Association awarded Journalism Teacher of the Year to Tara Huber, the adviser for "The Playwickian".

Originally named "Expressions Literary Magazine", the school's "Howler" literary magazine has received the Pennsylvania School Press Association award. In addition, the school's yearbook is called "The Redskin.

 Athletics 
Neshaminy High School's athletic teams compete in fall, winter, and spring sports at the ninth-grade, junior varsity, and varsity levels. The school is a member of the Pennsylvania Interscholastic Athletic Association (PIAA) Suburban One League. Fall sports include cheerleading, boys and girls cross country, field hockey, football, golf, boys and girls soccer, girls tennis, and girls volleyball. Winter sports include boys and girls basketball, boys and girls bowling, cheerleading, boys and girls indoor track, boys and girls swimming, and wrestling. Spring sports include baseball, boys and girls lacrosse, softball, boys tennis, boys and girls track, and boys volleyball.

 Mascot 

Neshaminy High School athletic teams are known as the Skins. The prior mascot was the Redskins.In 2012, a Neshaminy parent of Native American descent started a campaign to change the name because of its racially offensive and harmful nature. This parent spoke at numerous board meetings, though Neshaminy made no progress toward a change. As a result, a complaint was filed with the Pennsylvania Human Relations Commission (PHRC) in 2013. After a thorough investigation, the PHRC ruled against the Neshaminy school district, deciding that the school must change the mascot. However, the school administration appealed PHRC's ruling.

On October 23, 2013, the student editorial board of the high school's newspaper, "The Playwickian", stated its intention to no longer call the team "Redskin" in its publications. The school administration responded that the student editorial board lacked the power to make this decision. In 2014, newspaper staff members received awards from the Scholastic Keystone Press Awards contest and the Gold Circle Award from the Columbia Scholastic Press Association for articles published in "The Playwickian" on the issue.

In May 2014, a student submitted an opinion editorial containing the "Redskin" term. The school's Principal McGee demanded that "The Playwickian" run the piece and threatened to withdraw the newspaper's final issue if its staff did not comply. "The Playwickian" ran its last issue of the year without the article. The principal confiscated the newspaper, calling for an emergency meeting with its co-editors and restricting access to "The Playwickian's" social media and website.Foolish action and reaction - The Intelligencer: Editorials Later, McGee defend his actions in a statement on the school's website. On June 26, 2014, the Neshaminy School Board gave "The Playwickian" authority to ban the term "redskin" in articles, but required the paper to publish editorials and letters to the editor with the term present and unedited.

In 2015, the PHRC made a preliminary finding that the name Redskins is "racially derogatory" and creates a "hostile educational environment." The case then proceeded to a full committee hearing. After six years of controversy, the PHRC held a hearing in January 2019. In November 2019, the PHRC ruled that Neshaminy High School could continue to use the name but must cease using any imagery promoting negative stereotypes of Native Americans. In addition, PHRC required the school to teach its students about Native American history to prevent the use of stereotypes. The school district spent over $400,000 in legal fees in its campaign to retain the Redskin nickname.

 Championships 
The school has won several PIAA state athletic championships.

 Soccer 
The soccer program has four state championship titles. The boys' program won PIAA State Championships in 1982, 1984, and 1994. The girls' program won the title in 2013.

 Football 

The first football team was assembled in 1928 when the school was known as Langhorne-Middletown High School. Under head coach, Mike DeRisi, the football team had a to a combined record of 14-4-2 in 1946 and 1947. The team became a traditional powerhouse under head coach Harry E. Franks from 1952 through 1959, compiling a 69–10–2 record and scoring 2,203 points for 857 points against. The football team had undefeated seasons in 1954 and 1956.

John Petercuskie took over the head coaching position from 1960 through 1965, leading the team to a 59–1–5 record and ad 26 shutout victories. Under Petercuskie, the football team scored 1,925 points for 410 points against; the team was undefeated between 1960 and 1965, except in 1961, with a 51-game winning streak starting in 1961 and lasting until 1965.

Jack Swartz coached the team from 1968 through 1972, compiling a 43–11–1 record. The 1971 team had an 11–0 perfect record and is regarded as one of the best in Pennsylvania history. PFN rated this Pennsylvania's team of the century in 2004. In 1988, coach John Chaump took a team with an 11–0 regular season record to the semi-finals of the first-ever Pennsylvania state playoffs (statewide).

Beginning in 1995, head coach Mark Schmidt continued the winning tradition with a state playoff record of 16–6, three conference championships (2001, 2005, and 2008), two conference co-championships (2002, 2004), seven state playoff appearances (2001, 2002, 2004, 2005, 2007, 2008, and 2009), and one Pennsylvania state championship (2001).

 Notes 

Notable alumni
Ryan Arcidiacono, professional basketball player
Chris Bahr, former NFL placekicker and NASL midfielder
Matt Bahr, former NFL placekicker
Len Barker, former MLB pitcher
Jim Dumont, professional football player
Richard "Rick" M. Eccles, professional football player
Anthony Fedorov, American Idol contestant
James Franklin, head football coach at Pennsylvania State University 
Mike Frederick, professional football player
Bob Grupp, former NFL and USFL punter
Kevin Kelly, Penn State placekicker
Christopher J. King, Pennsylvania legislator
Steve Shull, professional football player
Langhorne Slim, singer
Harry Schuh, former NFL offensive tackle
Claire Smith, award-winning baseball writer
Steven E. de Souza, film and television screenwriter, producer, and director
Daniel F. Styer, scientist and writer
Shea Tierney, NFL assistant coach
Catie Turner, American Idol'' contestant
Chris Vincent, professional football player
Frank A. Farry, State Senator (2023 - ), PA House of Representatives (2009-2022)

Notable faculty
Dick Bedesem, football player and coach
Mike Frederick, professional football player
John Petercuskie, football player and coach
Joe Plumeri, chair & CEO of Willis Group Holdings, owner of the Trenton Thunder; taught history and coached football from 1966 to 1968

References

Public high schools in Pennsylvania
Schools in Bucks County, Pennsylvania